The 2015 New Zealand Derby was a horse race which took place at Ellerslie Racecourse on Saturday 28 February 2015. It was the 140th running of the New Zealand Derby, and it was won by Mongolian Khan.

The race was billed as a match race between the highly rated Mongolian Khan and Volkstok'n'barrell, both of which had made a big impression in stringing together consecutive wins in major races throughout the summer. The eagerly anticipated clash lived up to expectations as the two exciting three-year-olds drew well clear of their rivals and fought a memorable struggle down the home straight. Having been clearly headed by Volkstok'n'barrell, Mongolian Khan fought back and proved too strong in the concluding stages, edging away to win by one length. There was a margin of more than five lengths back to the remainder of the field.

It was the first New Zealand Derby win for trainers Murray Baker and Andrew Forsman and rider Opie Bosson.

Mongolian Khan later went to Australia and won the Australian Derby at Randwick, becoming the first horse to win the New Zealand Derby-Australian Derby double since Bonecrusher in 1986. Volkstok'n'barrell won the Rosehill Guineas and was third in the Australian Derby.

Race details
 Sponsor: TV3
 Prize money: NZ$750,000
 Track: Good
 Number of runners: 17
 Winner's time: 2:28.40

Full result

Winner's details
Further details of the winner, Mongolian Khan:

 Foaled: 19 October 2011 in Australia
 Sire: Holy Roman Emperor; Dam: Centafit (Centaine)
 Owner: Inner Mongolia Rider Horse Club
 Trainer: Murray Baker & Andrew Forsman
 Breeder: Grenville Stud
 Starts: 7
 Wins: 6
 Seconds: 0
 Thirds: 0
 Earnings: $625,500

The road to the Derby
Early-season appearances in 2014-15 prior to running in the Derby.

 Mongolian Khan – 1st 3yo Salver, 1st Waikato Guineas, 1st Avondale Guineas
 Volkstok'n'barrell – 1st Bonecrusher Stakes, 1st Great Northern Guineas, 1st Karaka Mile, 3rd Avondale Guineas
 Sound Proposition – 6th Avondale Guineas
 Dee I Cee – no stakes races
 Midnitemagicman – 2nd Trevor Eagle Memorial, 3rd 3yo Salver, 4th Avondale Guineas
 Sealed By A Dance – no stakes races
 Margin Trader – 5th Great Northern Guineas, 5th Waikato Guineas, 9th Avondale Guineas
 Vavasour – 3rd Soliloquy Stakes, 2nd Royal Stakes, 1st Sir Tristram Fillies' Classic
 Chenille – no stakes races
 Prima – 3rd Waikato Guineas, 2nd Avondale Guineas
 Nymph Monte – 13th Avondale Guineas
 Giant Turtle – 2nd Waikato Guineas
 Gifted Lad – no stakes races
 McQueen – 4th Waikato Guineas, 5th Avondale Guineas
 Gaultier – 1st Levin Classic, 11th Waikato Guineas, 8th Avondale Guineas
 J'Walke – 12th Avondale Guineas
 Twya – 1st Wanganui Guineas, 3rd Bonecrusher Stakes, 6th Sarten Memorial, 11th Avondale Guineas

Subsequent Group 1 wins
Subsequent wins at Group 1 level by runners in the 2015 New Zealand Derby.

 Mongolian Khan - Australian Derby, Caulfield Cup
 Volkstok'n'barrell - Rosehill Guineas, Otaki-Maori Weight for Age

See also

 2019 New Zealand Derby
 2018 New Zealand Derby
 2017 New Zealand Derby
 2016 New Zealand Derby
 2014 New Zealand Derby
 2013 New Zealand Derby
 2012 New Zealand Derby
 2011 New Zealand Derby
 2010 New Zealand Derby
  Recent winners of major NZ 3 year old races
 Desert Gold Stakes
 Hawke's Bay Guineas
 Karaka Million
 Levin Classic
 New Zealand 1000 Guineas
 New Zealand 2000 Guineas
 New Zealand Oaks

References

New Zealand Derby
2015 in New Zealand sport
New Zealand Derby
February 2015 sports events in New Zealand